Memories of Ice is an epic fantasy novel by Canadian writer Steven Erikson, the third volume in his series the Malazan Book of the Fallen. The events of Memories of Ice begin just after the first book, Gardens of the Moon, and at the same time as the second, Deadhouse Gates.

Memories of Ice focuses on the renegade Malazan 2nd Army and their new allies on Genabackis, and their battle with the Pannion Domin, a new power emerging from the south of the continent. It also reveals a great deal more about the gods, ascendants and the history of the Imass, K'Chain Che'Malle and the Tiste races.

Plot summary
Memories of Ice takes place simultaneously with the events of Deadhouse Gates, beginning about four months after the events of Gardens of the Moon. Dujek's 2nd army allegedly goes renegade, with Whiskeyjack as second in command, to join Anomander Rake and Caladan Brood to attack the cannibalistic and wantonly destructive Pannion Domin led by the Jaghut Pannion Seer. The White Face Barghast join as well after Trotts proves himself in single combat against a key chief's son. The chief's other children discover that the Barghast are descended from T'lan Imass who didn't bind themselves to the Ritual of Tellann and release their gods from Capustan.

The first major battle is at Capustan, where the Fener-worshipping Grey Swords stave off the brunt of the assault until Dujek and company arrive. Grey Sword Shield Anvil Itkovian takes the suffering of the tens of thousands of dead upon himself, even though Fener's no longer available (after the events in Deadhouse Gates that take place shortly before) to relieve him, and the Grey Swords turn to the other gods of war for new sponsorship (Togg and Fanderay). Caravan guard Gruntle becomes the Mortal Sword of Treach when his friend Stonny is raped and beaten at Capustan, and he joins the campaign against the Pannion.

Toc the Younger, having disappeared during Gardens of the Moon, emerges from the warren of chaos through a rent near Morn with the elder god Togg present within and occasionally possessing him to meet Onos T'oolan and Draconus's daughter, Lady Envy, her pets, one of whom has the elder god and Togg's long-lost lover Fanderay present within, and her Seguleh swordsmen thralls. Lady Envy's group attacks the Pannion from a different angle and drives the Seer to Coral, though not before Toc infiltrates the Pannion and is then captured and tortured by the Seer.

The Bridgeburners reach Coral first and blow their way into the city with Moranth help while Quick Ben, with the Bargast Shaman Talamandas (whom he rescues from a spirit trap) and the support of Hood, evades the Pannion poisoning of the warrens in order to trap the Seer. Whiskeyjack is lost in the battle when Kallor—who as emperor tens of thousands of years earlier killed the population of a continent rather than letting them rebel (the bodies now form the imperial warren) -- betrays the attack when promised the position of king in the new House of Chains by the Crippled God, who is sponsoring the Pannion from behind the scenes. Anomander Rake submerges Moon's Spawn in the ocean off Coral to stealthily approach and crush the Pannion's redoubt in the end.

The Mhybe—Tattersail, Bellurdan, and Nightchill's host Silverfox's mother—ages rapidly and thinks herself ruined when Silverfox appears not to love her, but Kruppe persuades them to reconcile in the end after Silverfox with Kruppe's help prepares the warren of Tellann—seeded to fertility with Itkovian's memories of the pain of the T’lan Imass who gather to Silverfox’s call—to receive Togg and Fanderay as lords of the Beast Hold.

The Pannion Seer turns out to have been driven to insanity and mad vengeance by his and his sister's entrapment when hidden by Tool's sister Kilava in the rift at Morn to protect them from Pran Chole's intended genocide of the Jaghut hundreds of thousands of years earlier. The Seer uses the K'Chain Che'Malle Matron, who was freed from the rift when he and his sister were put there, to torture Toc and to generate K'Chain soldiers. When Paran as Master of the Deck chooses mercy, Quick Ben helps free the Seer's sister from the rift. The Seer then cooperates in using his Omtose Phellack warren's ice to slow Burn's poisoning by the Crippled God. For restoring Fanderay to him, Togg puts Toc's soul into the Seer's servant Anaster's soulless body and restores Tool's mortality and flesh.

Moon's Spawn is greatly damaged during the attack on the Pannion, and the fallen Bridgeburners, along with the leader of the Black Moranth, are laid to rest inside it. The remaining Bridgeburners (including Paran who with Dujek's help is listed among the casualties) retire to Darujhistan to open a bar, where the epilogue shows them listening to the Imperial Historian Duiker tell the story of the Chain of Dogs.

Sideplots involve the Mott Irregulars, Bauchelain and Korbal Broach's necromancy and repeated drubbings by Quick Ben and the Bridgeburners, love emerging between Whiskeyjack and the Tiste Andii Korlat, and the Seguleh and Tool having to be repeatedly dissuaded from testing their prowess against one another by Lady Envy.

Critical reception
Memories of Ice received critical acclaim.

In their review, the SF Site stated that Memories of Ice is "Easily one of the best books of the year. Steven Erikson has infused new life into one of the oldest traditions of fiction, and has done so in a manner that genuinely captures and reinterprets the spirit of the original Greek and Norse sagas."

Fantasy Book Reviews stated that "Memories of Ice is a book full of wonderful characters from a wide variety of well conceived races."

Pat on Pat's Fantasy Hotlist gave it a very positive review, stating that, "Memories of Ice in an undeniable masterpiece. After reading fantasy novels for well nigh two decades, I can't believe that I can still be awed to such a degree by an author's work."

References

2001 Canadian novels
Canadian fantasy novels
Malazan Book of the Fallen
Novels by Steven Erikson
Bantam Books books